Xyronotidae is a family of Central American grasshoppers in the order Orthoptera. There are at least two genera and four described species in Xyronotidae.

Genera
These two genera belong to the family Xyronotidae:
 Axyronotus Dirsh & Mason, 1979
 Xyronotus Saussure, 1884

References

Further reading

 
 

Caelifera